The Army–Navy lacrosse rivalry is an intercollegiate lacrosse rivalry between the Army Black Knights and the Navy Midshipmen. The two programs, historical rivals in other sports like football and soccer, have a fierce and nationally-relevant rivalry in lacrosse as well. With 25 national championships, 10 Final Fours in the NCAA era, and 190 consensus first team All-Americans, the two teams have been integral to the game's history. The rivalry carries a different spirit than many others in collegiate lacrosse, described by former Navy goalie Ryan Kern as: "t’s the same camaraderie that you had in the fall with the football game and it kind of comes out again in the spring with the lacrosse game,” Navy junior goalie Ryan Kern said. “No doubt, all the other sports are important, but just the sheer number of people that come to this game is crazy — just like the football game. You see 16,000 people come to a regular season lacrosse game, and that’s not happening at other lacrosse programs." After 101 meetings, Navy leads the series 62–36–3 through 2021.

Series History

Pre-NCAA Era (1924 to 1970) 
The teams first met in 1924, with the Midshipmen shutting out Army 5–0 in West Point. The rematch occurred the next year in Annapolis, the second of four consecutive Navy victories to begin the series. A tie in 1928 was part of the Midshipmen's first national championship season and 7–1–1 record. That game was followed by a three goal Army win five years later, their first in the rivalry; the series has been played annually since. The 1940s were a high point for the rivalry, as Army would capture national championships in the 1944 and 1945 seasons, sharing the '45 title with the Midshipmen. Navy campaigns in 1943, 1946, and 1949 also resulted in titles during this period.

Another crucial period began in the late '50s, as either Army or Navy won at least a share of the Wingate Memorial Trophy every year from 1958 to 1970. The lone exception during this stretch was 1968, when Johns Hopkins won the national championship outright. Navy's dominance over the sport was only checked by the Black Knights, the only team from the 1959 to 1966 to defeat the Mids. '61 and '63 victories in Annapolis by the Cadets were the only by a collegiate program during this period. Both teams entered the 1964 game with identical 8–0 records, with Navy pulling off their first win of four straight victories.

Navy Dominance (1970s to 2010) 

1970 ended with a three-way split of the national title between Navy, Hopkins, and Virginia. In the final game, Navy prevailed over Army to complete its undefeated season and secure a share of its 17th national title. The following year, the first NCAA Division I Men's Lacrosse Championship was held. The 1971 edition featured both the Cadets and Midshipmen, who both fell in the Final Four. Beginning in 1973, the Naval Academy would win its first of nine consecutive against Army, including a 16–13 victory in the 1978 NCAA tournament. The quarterfinals matchup was led by two Mids players, Mike Hannan and Mike Buzzell, with 6 and 5 goals respectively. In 1981, the Black Knights would halt the streak with a one goal victory in Annapolis. However, a postseason rematch would go the way of the Midshipmen. Outscoring Army nine to three in the second half, Navy would prevail 16 to 10.

In 1991, Army would join the Patriot League and relinquish its previous status as an independent program. The Midshipmen would abstain from conference membership until 2000, when it joined the ECAC Lacrosse League. Despite being a full member of the Patriot League since 1991, Navy would finally move its lacrosse program to the conference in 2004. That season would be the best for the Mids since the 1970s, as they captured both the regular season and conference tournament championships. That included an 18–10 victory over #9 Army in their first conference meeting. In the 2004 NCAA Championship, Navy would earn the 2 seed and make a run to the title game against the Syracuse Orange. A Michael Powell game winner capped a 3–1 Syracuse run in the final five minutes to deny the Mids their first NCAA title.

Subsequent years would generally not be kind for the Cadets. From 1973 to 2009, Navy would go 34–8 against Army, including a 13 game winning streak spanning 1998 to 2007. While Army would snap that streak in 2008 with a nine to six victory, the Cadets would not win more than two consecutive games until 2010.

Recent Years (2010 to Present) 
In 2010, Army won their first of six straight games against Navy, their longest streak in the rivalry's storied history. A 2011 victory in Annapolis was the Cadets' first since the 1997 campaign. Since 2015, the series has been relatively balanced, with the Midshipmen taking four of seven matchups. This has included two overtimes games, a 2016 victory for the #9 Mids to clinch the league title and a 2019 win for #20 Army, the 100th game in the rivalry's history. In the Patriot League tournament, the teams have split six meetings, three of which came in the final. After the 2020 game was cancelled due to the COVID-19 pandemic, the teams met again in 2021, with #16 Navy pervailing over #10 Army 9–4.

Rival Accomplishments 
The following summarizes the accomplishments of the two programs.

Game results

References 

College lacrosse rivalries in the United States
Army Black Knights men's lacrosse
Navy Midshipmen men's lacrosse